Austrella is a genus of lichenized fungi in the family Pannariaceae.

References

Peltigerales
Lichen genera
Peltigerales genera
Taxa named by Per Magnus Jørgensen